Shanbeh Bazar (also Romanized as Shanbeh Bāzār; also known as Sabzqabā) is a village in Lulaman Rural District, in the Central District of Fuman County, Gilan Province, Iran. At the 2006 census, its population was 697, in 188 families.

References 

Populated places in Fuman County